Dick, Dicks, or Dick's may refer to:

Media
 Dicks (album), a 2004 album by Fila Brazillia
 Dicks (band), a musical group
 Dick (film), a 1999 American comedy film
 "Dick" (song), a 2019 song by Starboi3 featuring Doja Cat

Names
 Dick (nickname), an index of people nicknamed Dick
 Dick (surname)
 Dicks (surname)
 Dick, a diminutive for Richard
 Dicks (writer) (1823–1891), a pen name of Edmond de la Fontaine of Luxembourg
 Dicks., botanical author abbreviation for James Dickson (1738–1822)

Places
 Dicks Butte, a mountain in California

Other uses
 Dick (slang), a dysphemism for the penis as well as a pejorative epithet
 Dick's Drive-In, a Seattle, Washington-based fast food chain
 Dick's Sporting Goods, a major sporting goods retailer in the United States
 Dick's Sporting Goods Park, a soccer stadium in Denver, Colorado
 Detective, in early 20th century or 19th century English
 Democratic Indira Congress (Karunakaran), or DIC(K), a political party

See also
 List of people with surname Dick
 Dickies
 Dicky (disambiguation)
 Dix (disambiguation)
 Dicker (disambiguation)
 Dyck
 I Love Dick, a novel by American artist and author Chris Kraus
 King Size Dick (born 1942), German rock music singer
 Spotted dick, a British pudding
 Slippery dick